Baby on Board may refer to:
Baby on board, a sign intended to be placed on a vehicle to encourage safe driving
Baby on Board (film), a 2009 film directed by Brian Herzlinger
"Baby on Board" (Modern Family), an episode of the television series Modern Family
"Baby on Board" (The Simpsons), a song performed by Homer Simpson's barbershop quartet